Dan McCarthy is a captain in the United States Navy and one of around 730 lawyers who are  members of the Judge Advocate General's Corps of the United States Navy. He was educated at the Duke University School of Law. McCarthy has been involved with the military commissions at Guantanamo Bay detention camp where over 250 suspected Enemy combatants and terrorists are being held to await trial.

He is chief prosecutor of the Judge Advocate General's Corps of the United States Navy at the Guantanamo Bay Naval Base. McCarthy is also the one who introduced Ex parte Quirin to Lieutenant Commander Charles Swift which would become bases for the military tribunals at the Guantanamo Bay detention camp. While Lieutenant Commander Charles Swift was at the base McCarthy was his supervisor and close friend.

See also

Judge Advocate General's Corps of the United States Navy
Guantanamo Bay detention camp
Guantanamo Bay Naval Base
Charles Swift

References

Duke University School of Law alumni
Living people
Year of birth missing (living people)
Judge Advocates General of the United States Navy